Behar TV is a Bosnian local commercial television channel based in Sarajevo, Bosnia and Herzegovina. The program is mainly produced in Bosnian language. Until 2009, television has operated under the name "TVX Sarajevo".

External links 
 

Mass media in Sarajevo
Television stations in Bosnia and Herzegovina